Johannes Seerane (born 30 March 1987) is a South African rugby union player, currently playing with Rustenburg Impala. His regular position is winger.

Career

Youth and Varsity rugby

Leopards

That was his only senior appearance for the Leopards.

Border Bulldogs

He made three appearances, scoring two tries in the 2012 Currie Cup First Division. He was also a regular in the 2013 Vodacom Cup, scoring four tries in his seven appearances, making him the Bulldogs' top try scorer in that competition.

He picked up an injury prior to the 2013 IRB Tbilisi Cup (see below), which ruled him out for the entire 2013 Currie Cup First Division competition.

At the end of 2013, he was involved in a serious car accident that saw him sustain burn injuries and saw him admitted to hospital in a serious condition.

Rustenburg Impala

He returned to Rustenburg in 2015 to sign for club side and defending SARU Community Cup champions, Rustenburg Impala.

Representative rugby

He was named in a South African Students and a South African Students Sevens side in 2012.

In 2013, he was initially included in a South Africa President's XV team to play in the 2013 IRB Tbilisi Cup, but had to withdraw through injury,

References

South African rugby union players
Living people
1987 births
Border Bulldogs players
Leopards (rugby union) players
Rugby union wings
Rugby union players from Mpumalanga